Groot-Bijgaarden is a village and deelgemeente in the municipality of Dilbeek, a suburb of Brussels, in Flanders, Belgium.

Toponymy
The name Bijgaarden is derived from the Germanic word for enclosure. The appellation "Great" (Groot) was attached to distinguish it from the smaller Klein-Bijgaarden nearby, now in the municipality of Sint-Pieters-Leeuw.

History
The earliest record of Groot-Bijgaarden is in the 12th century, when it appears as Bigardis. This derives from the house of Bijgaarden. They made various contributions to the abbeys of Affligem and Groot-Bijgaarden. As a result of different marriages, the village came into the hands of the Veele Family, an important family from Brussels.

After many donations, Groot-Bijgaarden was publicly sold to the counts of Königsegg-Erps in the second half of the 14th century.

It is a former municipality in the province of Flemish Brabant, Belgium. Since 1977 it is a subdivision (deelgemeente) of the municipality of Dilbeek.

Geography
Groot-Bijgaarden is situated between Dilbeek and Zellik. As of 31 December 2019 the population of Groot-Bijgaarden was 8.349.

Attractions
 Groot-Bijgaarden Castle: rebuilt castle, where an annual flower show is held in spring.
 Saint-Wivina Benedictine nunnery: founded in 1125, grew strongly thanks to various donations, sold publicly during the French Revolution.
 Sint-Egidius Church: built in 1776, rebuilt in 1950 after a hit by a German V2 during the Second World War

Gallery

Notes

Dilbeek
Former municipalities of Flemish Brabant